Bitmap is a type of memory organization or image file format used to store digital images.

Bitmap or bit map may also refer to:
Bit array, general bit-addressed data structures
Bitmap graphics, also known as raster graphics, an image represented by a generally rectangular grid of pixels (co-sitting points of colors)
Bitmap file format, a bitmap graphics file format with .bmp filename extension
Bitmap (group), an alternative music band from England
Bitmap index
Free space bitmap, an array of bits that tracks which disk storage blocks are in-use

See also
Bit
BMP (disambiguation)
Map